Abraham Farley (?1712–1791) was an English chamberlain who was custodian of the Domesday Book. He was appointed Deputy Chamberlain of the Exchequer in 1736 and became responsible for the public records at the Chapter House of Westminster Abbey. First amongst these was the Domesday Book, of which Farley became custodian, granting visiting antiquaries access to make transcripts for a fee. In 1753, he was approached by Philip Carteret Webb to make a transcript from Domesday Book; this he did, and, perhaps in return for Webb’s help in raising awareness of Domesday’s importance, waived the usual fee. Two years later, Webb’s paper on the Book was read to the Society of Antiquaries of London. In later life, Farley was to produce the first printed edition of the Domesday Book, which was then in high demand. Following a Parliamentary order in 1767, Farley was appointed co-editor of the Domesday printing project in 1770, alongside Charles Morton of the British Museum. In his Literary Anecdotes of the Eighteenth Century, the printer John Nichols remarked that Morton and Farley’s relationship was characterised by rivalry and mistrust. Farley, whom Nichols called "of all men the properest person for so important a trust", due to his "long and intimate acquaintance with the original record", evidently considered himself best fitted to produce the landmark work. Farley eventually cut Morton out altogether, pressing ahead with the work with Nichols’ co-operation. Farley received payment to the tune of £2,500 for his services.

See also
Publication of Domesday Book

References

External links 
 Oxford Dictionary of National Biography entry

1712 births
1791 deaths
British civil servants